The Royal Life Saving Society - Commonwealth is the umbrella organisation that links together lifesaving societies in the Commonwealth of Nations. The RLSS-Commonwealth organises the Commonwealth Lifesaving Championships. The Society hosts the  Quinquennial Commonwealth Conference and Lifesaving Championships.

See also
Royal Life Saving Society UK
Royal Life Saving Society Australia
Royal Life Saving Society of Canada

References

External links
RLSS Commonwealth homepage

Lifesaving organizations